Welioya Divisional Secretariat is a Divisional Secretariat of Mullaitivu District, of Northern Province, Sri Lanka.

Welioya Divisional Secretariat was proclaimed the 26th District of Sri Lanka and for administrative purpose brought under the jurisdiction of the Government Agent, Anuradhapura. However, for election purposes it was included in the Vavuniya Electoral District.

References
 Divisional Secretariats Portal

Divisional Secretariats of Mullaitivu District